Major-General Raymond Northland Revell Reade  (1861 – 18 October 1943) was a British Army general and Commandant of the Royal Military College of Canada.

Background
He was the son of John Page Reade and his wife Lady Mary Stuart Knox, daughter of Thomas Knox, 2nd Earl of Ranfurly. He was educated at Eton College and went to the Royal Military College, Sandhurst.

Military career
Reade was commissioned into the 85th Regiment of Foot on 14 January 1880. He served as Commandant of Royal Military College of Canada from 1901 to 1905.  His criticism of poor RMC examination marks in French, physics and chemistry in 1901 and surveying and physics 1904 led to reforms at the college: smaller classes for French, entrance tests in physics and chemistry, and separate instructors for physics and surveying. He also built up the RMC library and extended library privileges to Permanent Force Officers in the Kingston, Ontario area. A 25-bed hospital was constructed adjacent to the education block. A large gymnasium was constructed south of the Stone Frigate. He secured quarters for the staff-adjutant and his family in what was later called Panet House, after the first resident. He built an extension to the rear of the Stone Frigate for bathroom facilities.

He served in Malta and Scotland and became General Officer Commanding the Troops in the Straits Settlements in 1914. Poor health prevented his active service in World War I, but he commanded the 59th (2nd North Midland) Division from November 1915 to February 1916, and the 68th (2nd Welsh) Division for most of 1916 while they were under training in the UK. He was the British representative on the Inter-Allied Military Mission to Greece, 1918 for which he was awarded the Greek Medal of Military Merit, 1st Class.

Family
On 9 June 1894 Reade married Rose Frances Spencer, daughter of Colonel Almeric George Spencer and Alice Isabel Fraser.

References

Sources
 

 

|-

|-

|-

British Army major generals
King's Shropshire Light Infantry officers
1943 deaths
British Army personnel of the Second Boer War
Companions of the Order of St Michael and St George
Companions of the Order of the Bath
1861 births
Commandants of the Royal Military College of Canada
British Army generals of World War I